The men's 4 × 200 metres relay at the 2019 IAAF World Relays was held at the Nissan Stadium on 12 May.

Records
Prior to the competition, the records were as follows:

Results

Heats
Qualification: First 3 of each heat (Q) plus the 2 fastest times (q) advanced to the final.

Final

References

4 x 200 metres relay